Mark of Apollonias was a figure in early Christianity.  He was the nephew of Barnabas. Tradition holds that he was bishop of Apollonia, and he is sometimes numbered among the Seventy Disciples. It was in his mother's house that the disciples sheltered after the Ascension of Jesus. He is generally held to be the same person as John Mark, Mark the cousin of Barnabas, and Mark the Apostle. He is commemorated in the Orthodox Church on October 30.

See also 
 Mark the cousin of Barnabas
 John Mark

References

Seventy disciples
1st-century Christian saints
1st-century bishops in Roman Achaea
Followers of Jesus